Gimingham is a village and civil parish in the English county of Norfolk. Gimingham has no shops, but has a Church, a pond and a preserved Water Mill. Nearby road communications with Gimingham are the A140 to Norwich, the A148 (direct) and A149 (coast road) to King's Lynn, and the A149 into the Norfolk Broads and Great Yarmouth. The B1159 is a coastal road between Cromer and Mundesley. The nearest airport is Norwich International Airport.

Early history
Gimingham is in the Domesday Book of 1086 under the name of Gimingeham. The manor was held by William de Warenne. The village name is thought to mean the ‘Ham’ or the ‘Homestead of Gymma's people'. Gymma was the name of an Anglo-Saxon warlord who settled in this part of the country some time between the 5th and 6th century. The village name has appeared in several different versions. In 1192 it is documented as Gumingham whilst in 1211 it appears as Gemingehem.

Gimingham Parish Church

Gimingham Parish Church is called All Saints. The church has been part of the Trunch group of parishes since 1965 and is in the service of a team of clergy of these parishes. There was an earlier church on the site of the present one. Signs of early Anglo-Saxon quoins can be seen in the east wall of the chancel. The chancel dates from the early 14th century. The church is almost entirely built from un-knapped flint although there are some squared flints in the entrance porch. Some buttresses and arches are of brick construction. The porch has two storeys and was incorporated into a much older original porch. The room on the first floor is known as a parvise. This room was used in the past by priests who had travelled some distance to get to the church. It also may have been used in the past as part of the wedding service, with guests waiting there while the groom and bride exchanged their vows in the porch. The nave dates from the 15th century and was re-roofed around 1950. The battlemented tower is also 15th century.

Mill Pond and Water Mill

A feature of the village is the mill pond which stretches along the western edge of the main street. The pond is home to many species of water fowl and is very popular with local fisherman. The mill pond is filled by the River Mun. The area beyond the river is said to have been part of the stew pond, the fish-breeding place of a small monastery. Close to the mill pond is the rebuilt corn mill. The original watermill burnt down during the night of 15 February 1979. A mill mentioned in the Domesday Book stood on this location. The one previous to the present building was built in the 18th century of flint, brick and pantiles. The pit for the original water wheel still remains, as does the old diesel engine, which provided power to the mill for many years.

Treatment centre
Gimingham was the home of the former Diana Princess of Wales Treatment Centre, an independent addiction treatment centre that closed in 2009.

References

External links
 Google tour of Gimingham Church

i

Villages in Norfolk
Civil parishes in Norfolk
North Norfolk